Noutard's Green is a  hamlet within the civil parish of Shrawley in Worcestershire, England.

References

Villages in Worcestershire